The Franklin County Courthouse is located at 211 West Commercial Street in Ozark, the county seat of Franklin County, Arkansas.  It is a two-story brick structure, with a tower prominently sited at one corner.  The courthouse was built in 1904 to a design by Little Rock architect Frank W. Gibb, and originally had Italianate styling.  It was extensively damaged by fire in 1944, and its upper level was rebuilt in a Classical Moderne style to a design by T. Ewing Sheldon, an architect from Fayetteville.

The courthouse was listed on the National Register of Historic Places in 1995.

See also
National Register of Historic Places listings in Franklin County, Arkansas

References

Courthouses on the National Register of Historic Places in Arkansas
Government buildings completed in 1944
Franklin County, Arkansas
National Register of Historic Places in Franklin County, Arkansas
Historic district contributing properties in Arkansas